Hispasat 30W-6 (formerly Hispasat 1F) is a Spanish communications satellite by Hispasat that launched on a Falcon 9 on March 6, 2018. It is replacing Hispasat 1D at 30° West longitude and will provide service for television, broadband, corporate networks and other telecommunications applications. The satellite features 4 × SPT-100 plasma propulsion engines.

This mission also carried a small (90 kg) technology demonstration satellite called Payload Orbital Delivery System Satellite (PODSat), which was deployed from its mothership when still in a sub-geostationary transfer orbit.

See also 
Hispasat 36W-1

References

External links 
 Official Hispasat 30W-6 website

Satellites of Spain
Spacecraft launched in 2018
2018 in Spain
Satellites using the SSL 1300 bus
SpaceX commercial payloads
Communications satellites in geostationary orbit